Sunset Air Strip  is a private airport located one mile southwest of North Plains in Washington County, Oregon, USA. There are 16 aircraft based at the strip, which is managed by Roth Development Corp., which is owned by the neighbors. Some of the 17 neighbors to the strip have hangars on their property. The strip is owned by Roth Development, and the number of aircraft is limited to 50 by the Oregon Department of Aviation.

History
Sunset Air Strip was built in 1968. Many of the 17 homes around the strip were constructed in the 1970s. In 2003, Washington County created an overlay district covering the strip and adjoining properties that prohibited commercial aviation activities such as flight instruction. In 2013, it was proposed that an airpark district be created at the landing strip. The new district would allow for additional homes to be built on adjoining land that could house aircraft. Washington County approved the new district in October 2013, with two groups later challenging the district.
FAA 5010 data:

References

External links

Airports in Washington County, Oregon
1968 establishments in Oregon
Airports established in 1968